The 1972 International cricket season was from May 1972 to August 1972.

Season overview

June

Australia in England

References

1972 in cricket